Goat cheese is produced using goat milk, the milk of domestic goats. Goat milk is commonly used to make cultured dairy products, including cheese. Myriad goat milk cheeses are produced around the world.

Varieties 

 Anari cheese 
 Añejo cheese – a firm, aged Mexican cheese traditionally made from skimmed goat's milk, but most often available made from skimmed cow's milk.
 Anthotyros 
 Banon cheese 
 Bastardo del Grappa 
 Brunost (known as  when made with goat milk)  – a Norwegian brown goat cheese with a sweet flavor profile

 Bucheron – native to the Loire Valley in France
 Cabécou 
 Cabrales cheese 
 Caciotta 
 Caprino cheese 
 Castelo Branco cheese 
 Cathare 

 Chabichou 
 Chabis 
 Chevrotin
 Circassian cheese 
 Circassian smoked cheese 
 Couronne lochoise 

 Crottin de Chavignol 
 Dolaz cheese 
 Faisselle – a non-protected French cheese made of raw milk from goats, cows or sheep
 Feta 
 Formaela 

 Garrotxa cheese 
Gbejna friska - a fresh cheeselet similar to ricotta in texture - native to Maltese Islands 
Gbejna tal bzar - same as above but aged and coated in black pepper - native to Maltese Islands 
Gbejna mghoxxa - same as the fresh cheeslet but left to air dry - native to Maltese Islands 
 Halloumi 
 Jibneh Arabieh 
 Kars gravyer cheese 
 Kasseri 
 Kefalotyri 
 Leipäjuusto

 Majorero – from Spain, it is similar to Manchego, and is protected under European Law with Protected Designation of Origin (PDO) status.
 Manouri 
 Mató 
 Mizithra 
 Nabulsi cheese 
 Payoyo cheese
 Pélardon 

 Picodon 
 Picón Bejes-Tresviso 
 Pouligny-Saint-Pierre cheese 
 Rigotte de Condrieu 
 Robiola 
 Rocamadour cheese 
 Rubing

 Sainte-Maure de Touraine 
 Santarém cheese 
 Selles-sur-Cher cheese 
 Snøfrisk 
 Testouri
 Tulum cheese 
 Valençay cheese 
 Van herbed cheese 
 Xynomizithra 
 Xynotyro

Brands 
 Ardagh Castle Cheese 
 Ardsallagh Goat Farm 
 Blue Rathgore 
 Bluebell Falls 
 Bonne Bouche 
 Bouq Émissaire 
 Capricious 
 Chaubier – a washed rind French Cheese made from half goat's milk and half cow's milk 
 Chavroux 
 Chèvre noir 
 Clochette 
 Clonmore Cheese 
 Cooleeney Farmhouse Cheese 
 Corleggy Cheese 
Gleann Gabhra 
Glyde Farm Produce 
 Harbourne Blue 
 Humboldt Fog
Kunik cheese
Pantysgawn 
St Tola

See also

 List of goat dishes
 List of cheeses
 List of dairy products
 Lists of prepared foods

References

External links
 
 Goat's milk cheeses. Cook's info.

 
Goat's milk cheeses